Asset tracking refers to the method of tracking physical assets, either by scanning barcode labels attached to the assets or by using tags using GPS, BLE, LoRa, or RFID which broadcast their location. These technologies can also be used for indoor tracking of persons wearing a tag.

RFID

'Passive' RFID tags broadcast their location but have limited transmission range (typically a few meters). Longer-range "smart tags" use 'active' RFID -where a radio transmitter is powered by a battery and can transmit up to 2000 meters (6,600 feet) in optimum conditions. RFID-based Asset Tracking requires an infrastructure to be put in place before the whereabouts of tags may be ascertained. An asset tracking system can record the location and usage of the assets and generate various reports. Unlike traditional barcode labels, RFID tags can be read faster and have higher durability. RFID is integrated in smart warehousing to track inventory and other assets. Realtime information of the tagged objects are obtained including the location, activity and other characteristics.

Barcodes

Assets can be tracked via manually scanning barcodes such as QR codes. QR codes can be scanned using smartphones with cameras and dedicated apps, as well as with barcode readers.

NFC

Latest trend in asset tracking is using NFC. NFC technology simplifies tracking of assets by tapping the assets and getting the details. 
This is an advantage for tracking critical assets where user needs to see the condition of the asset to be tracked.

GPS asset tracking

Assets may also be tracked globally using devices which combine the GPS system and mobile phone and/or satellite phone technology. Such devices are known as GPS asset trackers and are different from other GPS tracking units in that they rely on an internal battery for power rather than being hard-wired to a vehicle's battery. The frequency with which the position of the device must be known or available dictates the quality, size or type of GPS asset tracker required. It is common for asset tracking devices to fail due to Faraday cage effects as a huge proportion of the worlds assets are moved via intermodal containers. However modern tracking technology has now seen advances in signal transmission that allows enough signal strength reception from the GPS satellite system which can then be reported via GPRS to terrestrial networks.

Mobile phones are personal devices. Asset tracking apps for smart devices had been used as a means of personal tracking and rescues. For example, Find My iPhone is an app and service provided by Apple; it was used in rescuing a missing person in deep ravine from a car accident after other attempts failed. There are also tracking apps combined with viewing functions used as a surveillance similar to FAA's Automatic dependent surveillance – broadcast (ADS-B).

Wi-fi, IR, LoRa and Bluetooth
For indoor asset tracking Wi-fi combined with another technology like IR has been used. Bluetooth and LoRa technology have also been used, and may provide more accuracy even if these radio technologies weren't primarily developed for location tracking. In order to position an asset via Bluetooth or LoRa, which is a basic requirement for asset tracking, the RSSI and TDOA is used to calculate a distance to the signaling transmitter from the signal strength. The principles for position determination are trilateration, triangulation and fingerprinting.  LoRa can be used for both indoor and outdoor tracking as LoRa signals can travel longer distances (kilometers).

See also

 Barcode
 Near-field communication
 Radio-frequency identification
 Track and trace

References

Asset
Barcodes
Tracking